Get a wiggle on is an 18th century English language idiom and Colloquial Expression which means to move quickly or hurry.

Etymology
In 1891 Wilson's Photographic Magazine published "The American Psalm of Life" which began, "Get a wiggle on, my lad, Don't walk at a funeral pace..." By 1919 the phrase was also used in a song, "Get a wiggle on, get a wiggle on, Don't stand there with a giggle-on. By the 1920s the term had found its way into the American language as slang.

History
The Cambridge Dictionary defines the phrase as meaning to hurry up. Get a wiggle on is both an English language idiom and a Colloquial Expression. The phrase has been in use since 1891 and is still being used in the 21st century. The phrase is also slang in Australia and it appears in the Aussie Slang Dictionary

See also
List of English-language idioms

References

Idioms
Colloquial terms
American slang
Category
Victorian era